Phrynetopsis fuscicornis is a species of beetle in the family Cerambycidae. It was described by Chevrolat in 1856. It has a wide distribution in Africa. It contains the varietas Phrynetopsis fuscicornis var. mystica.

References

Phrynetini
Beetles described in 1856